Our Lady J is an Emmy-nominated screenwriter, producer and director, best-known for her work on Pose, Transparent, and American Horror Story. She holds the honor of being the first out trans woman to perform at Carnegie Hall, as well as the first out trans writer to be hired in a television writers room.

Early career 
From 2000 to 2010, Our Lady J freelanced as a collaborative pianist and musical director in New York City for multiple classical and musical theatre institutions, including American Ballet Theatre, Alvin Ailey American Dance Theatre, and The Mark Morris Dance Group. In 2004, Lady J met Stefani Germanotta aka Lady Gaga at the CAP21 musical-theater conservatory in New York, where she served as an accompanist and music director.

Lady J made her Carnegie Hall debut with The New York City Gay Men’s Chorus in 2004, and continued to perform as their pianist until 2007. In 2008, she returned to Carnegie Hall to perform with Justin Vivian Bond in The McGarrigle Christmas Hour concert.

Our Lady J toured and performed with pop singer Sia Furler from 2012 to 2014.

Lady J released her first studio album in 2013, titled Picture of a Man.

From 2014 to 2015, Our Lady J performed as a guest musician on RuPaul’s Drag Race seasons 6 and 7.

In 2014, Our Lady J coached Andrew Garfield for Arcade Fire's music video, "We Exist". The video is described by Arcade Fire as telling “the story of a young person’s struggle with gender identity,” depicting Garfield as a gender-nonconforming person who is assaulted at a bar, but later finds acceptance at an Arcade Fire concert.

TV and film career 
In 2014, Joey Soloway hired Our Lady J as a staff writer for the hit series Transparent, making Lady J the first out trans person to be hired into a Hollywood writers' room. Lady J's episode, "If I Were a Bell", drew international critical acclaim for its authentic portrayal of a trans childhood. During her four seasons working on the series, Lady J was promoted from staff writer to story editor, to co-producer, and then to producer.

In 2017, Ryan Murphy hired Lady J to write and produce the television show Pose. Lady J's contributions to the HIV/AIDS storylines went on to become the center of both critical and audience acclaim.

On two seasons of Transparent and on all three seasons of Pose, Lady J made on-screen musical cameo appearances, performing with Billy Porter, MJ Rodriguez, Patti Lupone, and Sandra Bernhard.

In 2020, New Regency teamed with Our Lady J to develop a pilot based on the life of Dante "Tex" Gill, called Rub & Tug. The story had previously been set up as a feature film with Scarlett Johansson attached, but after outcry from the LGBTQ+ community, Johansson left the project and Lady J was brought on to reimagine the story with authentic casting.

In 2022, Lady J continued her collaboration with Ryan Murphy by writing an episode for season two of American Horror Stories. She then went on to executive produce and write season eleven of American Horror Story, entitled NYC. Our Lady J made her directorial debut on AHS: NYC episode nine, "Requiem 1981/1987: Part 1".

In late 2022, it was announced that Our Lady J would develop a comedy series at Hulu with comedians Holmes and Caleb Hearons, on which Lady J will serve as executive producer and showrunner.

Personal life and activism 
Our Lady J was born in Chambersburg, Pennsylvania in 1978, growing up in an Amish and Mennonite community. She attended Interlochen Center for the Arts from 1994 to 1996, studying in classical piano and composition during her junior and senior years of high school.

In 2004, Our Lady J came out as transgender and adopted the name "Our Lady J" as a nod to Jean Genet's subversive novel, Our Lady of the Flowers.

In 2008, Our Lady J garnered the attention of Dolly Parton by performing her songs, and the two struck up a friendship. In 2010, Parton helped fund Lady J's top surgery, along with Jake Shears, Rosie O'Donnell, Margaret Cho, Tori Amos and others.

In 2009, Our Lady J became the subject of tabloid fodder for her relationship with actor Daniel Radcliffe. The two were featured in Out discussing their friendship and careers.

During Lady J's first appearance on RuPaul's Drag Race in 2014, RuPaul drew public criticism for using the term "she-male", quickly starting a firestorm about trans-inclusive language within the LGBTQ community. In an article for The Huffington Post, Our Lady J defended RuPaul, saying "As an artist, I love language, and I cherish free speech. Drag is punk and should never be subjected to politically correct ideals."

From 2015 to 2016, Our Lady J successfully spearheaded the initiative to include gender affirming care in the Writers Guild of America's health insurance coverage, the first arts guild to cover transgender healthcare. She was quoted in The New York Times as saying, "Having to battle for insurance and having to battle with doctors is overwhelming. Taking care of your health as a trans person can feel like a full-time job". About the season finale of Pose, Lady J said, "I was able to take my own experiences and bring them into this space. It was a challenge, but it was also healing to be able to give that knowledge. And I do hope that viewers are encouraged to get tested and to not be so afraid of what HIV once was."  In 2019, she was featured on POZ Magazine’s POZ 100 list of HIV/AIDS activists.

In 2019, Our Lady J joined the board of GLAAD. That same year, she slammed the LA Times for body-shaming her at the Golden Globes, thus ending the LA Timess long-standing history of criticizing women's appearances on red carpets. "When you judge women for what they're wearing, you're not only judging the fabric on their bodies — you are judging their actual bodies, the medical history of their bodies, and the emotional struggle they have with their bodies because of articles like this," Our Lady J said.

Lady J was a featured speaker at 2021's World AIDS Day National Observance, alongside Dr. Anthony Fauci, White House National AIDS Policy Director Harold Phillips, U.S. Senator Raphael Warnock, and Congresswoman Barbara Lee. That same year, she was awarded the National Leadership Recognition Award by the National AIDS Memorial.

Filmography

Television

Writing

Acting

Awards 
Our Lady J has received two Peabody Awards, three American Film Institute awards, three Emmy nominations, three Writers Guild Award nominations, and two NAACP Image Award nominations. As a producer, her shows have garnered a combined total of 48 Emmy nominations, 12 Emmy wins, 13 Golden Globe nominations, 3 Golden Globe wins, 20 Critics' Choice nominations, and 3 Critics' Choice wins, among others.

References

External links

  – official site
 
 Daniel Radcliffe and Our Lady J: The Odd Couple by Noah Michelson, Out (2010)
 Our Lady J on Giggling With Lady Gaga and Beyonce's Beauty Treatments, Paper (2013)

1978 births
Living people
21st-century classical pianists
21st-century American pianists
21st-century American women pianists
American classical pianists
American women singer-songwriters
American singer-songwriters
American television writers
American women classical pianists
American women television writers
LGBT classical musicians
American LGBT musicians
LGBT people from Pennsylvania
LGBT producers
American LGBT screenwriters
Transgender non-binary people
Non-binary musicians
People from Chambersburg, Pennsylvania
Screenwriters from Pennsylvania
Transgender women